Raglius alboacuminatus is a species of dirt-colored seed bug in the family Rhyparochromidae. It is found in Africa, Europe and Northern Asia (excluding China), and North America.

Subspecies
These six subspecies belong to the species Raglius alboacuminatus:
 Raglius alboacuminatus alboacuminatus (Goeze, 1778)
 Raglius alboacuminatus bicolor (Horvath, 1911)
 Raglius alboacuminatus flavatus (Horvath, 1882)
 Raglius alboacuminatus funereus (Puton, 1878)
 Raglius alboacuminatus implagiatus (Stichel, 1957)
 Raglius alboacuminatus nigrus (Michalk, 1938)

References

External links

 

Rhyparochromidae
Articles created by Qbugbot
Taxa named by Johann August Ephraim Goeze
Insects described in 1778